Pseudacorethra zischkai is a species of beetle in the family Cerambycidae, the only species in the genus Pseudacorethra.

It was described by Friedrich F. Tippmann in 1960.

References

Rhinotragini
Monotypic beetle genera